The Hungarian Manual Alphabet (or a magyar ujjábécé in Hungarian) is used for fingerspelling in Hungarian Sign Language. The most common is the one-handed alphabet near the face, but an adapted LSF-style alphabet is sometimes employed.

External links
A magyar jelnyelv szublexikális szintjének leírása

Manual alphabet